Keith Jack (25 April 1927 – 22 November 1982) was an Australian cricketer. He played in 25 first-class matches for Queensland between 1948 and 1953.

See also
 List of Queensland first-class cricketers

References

External links
 

1927 births
1982 deaths
Australian cricketers
Queensland cricketers
Cricketers from Queensland